In the 1951–52 season, USM Blida competed in the Division Honneur for the 19th season French colonial era, as well as the Forconi Cup. They competed in Division Honneur, and the Forconi Cup.

Pre-season and friendlies

Competitions

Overview

Division Honneur

League table

Results by round

Matches

Forconi Cup

Squad information

Playing statistics

Goalscorers
Includes all competitive matches. The list is sorted alphabetically by surname when total goals are equal.

References

External links
 L'Echo d'Alger : journal républicain du matin
 La Dépêche quotidienne : journal républicain du matin
 Alger républicain : journal républicain du matin

USM Blida seasons
Algerian football clubs 1951–52 season